Aplodon is the scientific name of two genera of organisms and may refer to:
Aplodon (plant), a genus of mosses in the family Splachnaceae
Aplodon (gastropod), a genus of snails in the family Modulidae
Aplodon, a genus of mollusks in the family Mycetopodidae; synonym of Monocondylaea